Hulli was the fifth attested ruler of the kingdom of Tabal in Anatolia, in what is now Turkey. He ruled from 730-726 BC and was succeeded by his son, Ambaris.

References 

Hittite kings